Jeffrey Dwight Bryant (born May 22, 1960 in Atlanta, Georgia) is a former defensive end in the National Football League. Bryant played his entire twelve-season career for the Seattle Seahawks.  He attended Clemson University.

References

1960 births
Living people
Players of American football from Atlanta
American football defensive ends
Clemson Tigers football players
Seattle Seahawks players